The Braeburn is a cultivar of apple that is firm to the touch with a red/orange vertical streaky appearance on a yellow/green background. Its color intensity varies with different growing conditions.

It was discovered as a chance seedling in 1952 by the farmer O. Moran from Waiwhero in the Moutere Hills near Motueka, New Zealand. It was then cultivated by the Williams Brothers nursery as a potential export variety. A study published in 2020 indicated Braeburn is the offspring of Delicious and Sturmer Pippin, with Lady Hamilton as a sibling.  The apple itself is named after Braeburn Orchard near Motueka, where it was first commercially grown.

Braeburn apples have a combination of sweet and tart flavor. They are available October through April in the northern hemisphere and are medium to large in size. They are a popular fruit for growers because of their ability to store well when chilled.

Braeburn apples are useful in cooking as they hold their shape and do not release a great deal of liquid, making them well-suited for tarts. According to the US Apple Association website it is one of the fifteen most popular apple cultivars in the United States.

Braeburn browning disorder 
Apples can be preserved by short, medium or long-term
storage. Braeburn can turn brown inside during commercial long term storage, and it's usually not possible to tell if an apple has the Braeburn browning disorder until a person bites or cuts into it.  Apples respond dramatically to both temperature and atmosphere modification. Rapid temperature reduction and the exacting maintenance of low temperature close to the chilling point of the variety can provide good to medium quality product following 3 to 6 months of storage and in some cases longer. However, modern commercial warehouses couple
temperature management with controlled atmosphere (CA) for long-term storage of apples. Braeburn can be stored at 0 °C in the air for 3–4 months, and in CA for 8–10 months, with only a slight susceptibility to scalding although it is sensitive to carbon dioxide. The variety has a relatively impermeable skin, which restricts diffusion of gases into and out of the fruit, leading to high internal carbon dioxide concentrations.

The browning disorder seems worse in overmature fruit, fruit from lightly cropped trees, and large fruit, but it can show up on different trees in different years, and in some regions, but not others.

Maintaining the superior qualities of Braeburn while eliminating Braeburn browning disorder led to the development of the Jazz cultivar. Since Braeburn is such a desirable variety, commercial orchards and trees in regions and locations that have proven not susceptible to the browning disorder are being maintained. Since most home orchardists do not attempt very long term storage, they do not encounter the browning disorder.

Disease susceptibility 

Braeburn has high susceptibility to scab, powdery mildew, cedar apple rust, and fire blight.

See also 

Nicoter; trademark named Kanzi, a descendant of the Braeburn
Scifresh; trademark named Jazz, offspring of the Braeburn
Sweetie; trademark name for 'PremA280', offspring of the Braeburn

References 

Motueka
New Zealand apples
Apple cultivars